Cypress Hill IV is the fourth studio album by American hip hop group Cypress Hill. It was released on October 6, 1998 by Ruffhouse and Columbia Records. After 3 years from their previous album, Cypress Hill released the ‘IV’ album. The skeletons on the cover are posing as the three wise monkeys (see no evil, hear no evil, speak no evil). Rappers MC Eiht and Barron Ricks were featured on the album. The album went Gold in the U.S with over 500,000 units sold.

Reception

IV received mixed reviews from critics, with AllMusic giving it a strongly negative review.

Rolling Stone - 3.5 Stars (out of 5) - "Cypress Hill's most bangin' LP since their 1991 debut.… Cypress Hill still name-check firearms, threaten rivals and smoke more weed than a congregation of Rastas. But the obsessions are means to an end."

The Wire - "…they come out fighting. Red eyed, rabid and slobbering with skunk-fueled menace.… gangsta rap's future as a musical force is secure."

Rap Pages - 4 (out of 5) - "Like previous albums…IV's fabulous formula of speakerphone tones by B-Real and sporadic comments by Sen Dog resembles 'How I Could Just Kill A Man'."

Track listing
All tracks produced by DJ Muggs

Bonus tracks
Rags to Riches is included as a bonus track on some editions of the album, which is actually a Baron Ricks song, credited to Baron Ricks featuring Cypress Hill & Self Scientific. It was separately released on his 12" vinyl single Rags to Riches / Harlem River Drive.

Personnel
B-Real - vocals
Sen Dog - vocals
DJ Muggs - arranger, producer, mixing
Eric "Bobo" Correa - bass, percussion, backing vocals  
MC Eiht - vocals 
Chace Infinite (of Self Scientific) - vocals
Barron Ricks - vocals 
Mike Sims - Bass, Guitar 
Troy Stanton - engineer 
Reggie Stewart - bass
Sean Evans - art direction 
Dean Karr - photography 
Manuel Lecuona - mastering

Charts

Certifications

References

External links

Cypress Hill albums
1998 albums
Columbia Records albums
Albums produced by DJ Muggs
Ruffhouse Records albums
Cannabis music